Dorothy Blackham (1 March 1896 – 4 September 1975) was an Irish illustrator, artist, and teacher.

Early life and education
Dorothy Isabel Blackham was born at 4 Beechwood Rd, Rathmines, Dublin, on 1 March 1896. Her parents were Charles H. Blackham, chief cashier at Kingsbridge railway station, and Jane Ruthven Blackham (née Lowry). Through her father's side, Blackham was related to the Wharton family of artists, with her maternal grandfather having been Thomas Kennedy Lowry, an antiquarian and crown prosecutor. Her artistic training began in the Royal Hibernian Academy (RHA), where she studied under Dermod O'Brien. During this time Blackham developed an interest in poster design. She went on the attend the Dublin Metropolitan School of Art and Goldsmiths College in London.

Artistic career
Blackham was a prolific artist, exhibiting and contributing throughout Ireland. From 1916 to 1946, she exhibited regularly with the RHA, with her work also being shown by the Ulster Society of Women Artists, the Water Colour Society of Ireland, and the Arts and Crafts Society of Ireland. From 1924 she was exhibited at the Tailteann Games, winning medals in 1928 and 1932. Her friend, and fellow artist, Mainie Jellett was a significant influence on Blackham. Through Jellett, she became interested in The White Stag group and exhibited with them four times between 1940 and 1941. She was a member of the Dublin Painters' Society, exhibiting with them in the late 1930s. She was also active with the Picture Hire Club from 1941 to 1942. It was at this time that Blackham experimented with lino-cuts, creating large landscape prints. As a close friend of Elizabeth and Lily Yeats, she collaborated extensively with the Cuala Press, creating wood and lino cuts for illustrations and greetings-cards. Blackham also produced illustrations for the Cluna Press, the Irish Tourist Association, The Bell, and The Ideal Irish Home. She designed the cover of The Boyne Valley and its antiquities (1936), a booklet by Rev. Myles V. Ronan. As well as being an active artist, she taught in a number of Dublin schools, including Alexandra College from 1936 to 1943 and the Hall School, Monkstown.

Blackham worked as an assistant warden at the Gibraltarian Evacuation Camp in Derry. She married Elsner Stewart in 1947, and the couple moved to London. Whilst there, Blackham continued her career as a teacher, and exhibited under her maiden name. She was exhibited by the Royal Academy of Arts, the Royal West of England Academy, the United Society of Artists, and the Royal Society of British Artists. Her work generally drew on Ireland for inspiration, in particular the north and west of the country, she also created works based on scenes in London and continental Europe.

Later life and legacy
Blackham and her husband returned to Ireland in 1967, settling in Donaghadee, County Down. She suffered from arthritis in her later years, but she continued to paint until her death. Blackham died on 4 September 1975, at Donaghadee. Two posthumous exhibitions of her work were held at Queen's University Belfast (QUB) in 1976, and at the Neptune Gallery, Dublin in 1977. Examples of her work are held in the collections of QUB, the Hugh Lane Gallery, and the South London Gallery. Her work is also held as part of the Anna Russell collection of Yeats material at the National Gallery of Ireland.

References

External links
 

1896 births
1975 deaths
20th-century Irish painters
20th-century Irish women artists
Alumni of Goldsmiths, University of London 
Alumni of the National College of Art and Design
Artists from Dublin (city)
Irish women painters